The Humongous Book of Dinosaurs is a large dinosaur book for children by David Norman. An illustrated non-fiction book, it was published in 1997 by Stewart, Tabori, & Chang Publishers. It has 1,256 pages.

Bibliography

References

Sources
  

Children's non-fiction books
1997 children's books
Children's books about dinosaurs
American children's books